John Sund (born 1957 in Copenhagen) is a Danish guitarist and composer. He has played and recorded with many leading musicians, such as Thomas Clausen, The Danish Radio Big Band, Palle Mikkelborg, Bo Stief, Lelo Nika, Vincent Nilson, Creme Fraiche Big Band, and many more.

External links 
Official homepage

1957 births
Living people
Danish composers
Male composers
Danish guitarists
Olufsen Records artists
Date of birth missing (living people)